Orestes, son of Archelaus I, succeeded in his minority as king of Macedonia after his father was killed. He reigned from 400/399 to 398/7 BC, when his guardian (epitropos) and uncle, Aeropus II, killed or deposed him. Aeropus thereafter reigned alone until his death in 394/3 BC.

References

Notes

Citations

4th-century BC Macedonian monarchs
4th-century BC rulers
Argead kings of Macedonia